Thetford Bridge railway station served the eastern part of Thetford, Norfolk, England between 1875 and 1953.

History
This curve was opened first, on 15 November 1875, along with Thetford Bridge station. The B&TR was purchased by the Great Eastern Railway (GER) in 1878.

Trains on the B&TR were operated by the T&WR until 1879, when operation was taken over by the GER; after this, trains from Bury began to run to Thetford; the east to south curve at Thetford Bridge was not used after 1880. Thetford Bridge was then the last station before .

In September 1911 the station was used as a railhead by the British Army who were running a series of war games.

In January 1923 the station was taken over by the London and North Eastern Railway.

Following nationalisation in 1948 Thetford Bridge was operated by the Eastern Region of British Railways.

The station closed on 8 June 1953.

References

External links
Thetford Bridge Station on navigable 1946 O.S. map

Disused railway stations in Norfolk
Former Great Eastern Railway stations
Railway stations in Great Britain opened in 1875
Railway stations in Great Britain closed in 1953
Thetford